The Strategic Studies Institute (SSI) is the U.S. Army's institute for strategic and national security research and analysis. It is part of the U.S. Army War College. SSI conducts strategic research and analysis to support the U.S. Army War College curricula, provides direct analysis for Army and Department of Defense leadership, and serves as a bridge to the wider strategic community. It is located at Carlisle Barracks, Pennsylvania.

Organization

SSI is composed of civilian research professors, uniformed military officers, and a professional support staff. SSI is divided into three components: the Department of Research, the US Army War College Fellowship Program (USAWCFP) and the US Army War College Press. In addition to its organic resources, SSI has a web of partnerships with strategic analysts around the world, including the foremost thinkers in the field of security and military strategy.

Products

SSI & US Army War College Press major product are studies published by the institute and distributed to key strategic leaders in the Army and Department of Defense, the military educational system, Congress, the media, other think tanks and defense institutes, and major colleges and universities. SSI studies use history and current political, economic, and military factors to develop strategic recommendations. These studies often influence the formulation of U.S. military strategy, national security policy, and even the strategies of allies and friends. SSI analysts have contributed to major U.S. national security strategy documents and to U.S. Army doctrine. The U.S. Army War College also hosts a major annual strategy conference at Carlisle Barracks.

Parameters is a referred journal of ideas and issues, providing a forum for the expression of mature thought on the art and science of land warfare, joint and combined matters, national and international security affairs, military strategy, military leadership and management, military history, ethics, and other topics of significant and current interest to the US Army and Department of Defense. It serves as a vehicle for continuing the education and professional development of USAWC graduates and other senior military officials, as well as members of government and academia concerned with national security affairs.

Staff

National security experts such as Harry Summers, Sherifa Zuhur, Jeffrey Record, Phil Williams, Sheila Jager, Robert (Robin) Dorff, Douglas MacDonald, Thomas-Durrell Young, Andrew Scobell, Cori Dauber, Dallas Owens, and Stephen Biddle have been faculty members or associated with SSI in the past. Strategic thinkers such as Michael Howard, Colin Gray, Daniel Byman, Thomas Marks, Dennis Ippolito, Amit Gupta, Leonid I. Polyakov, Williamson Murray, John White, John Deutch, Steven Metz, and Eliot Cohen have written SSI studies. The current director of SSI is Carol Evans. Tom Kardos is deputy director. Antulio Echevarria is the Editor-in-Chief of the USAWC Press and the USAWC Quarterly Journal, Parameters. SSI's analytical staff includes Don Snider, Trey Braun, John Deni, Leonard Wong, Tony Pfaff, Chris Bolan, Chris Mason, and Nate Freier. In addition to their work for SSI, the institute's staff analysts are well-known experts in their fields with multiple publications, congressional testimony, and many media interviews.

External links

Research institutes in Pennsylvania
Foreign policy and strategy think tanks in the United States
United States Army War College